Orient Shield is an annual training exercise executed in Japan between the Japanese Ground Self Defense Forces (JGSDF) and United States Army. Since 1985, it has focused on development and refinement of systems and tactics in order to enhance bilateral tactical planning, coordination, and interoperability. The exercise is designed to enhance bilateral combat effectiveness at the battalion and brigade levels while strengthening military-to-military relationships and demonstrating American commitment to support regional security interests. Rotating between JGSDF divisions of the five Regional Armies, Orient Shield leverages the unique capabilities of the training units to provide for ever-increasing tactical complexity and realism. The ongoing tension around North Korea's nuclear program has added an additional layer of importance to the annual exercise.

Originally executed as a one week platoon-level Field Training Exercise (FTX), Orient Shield has evolved into a two week battalion-level FTX, brigade-level computer assisted Command Post Exercise (CPX), and company-level Combined Arms Live Fire Exercise (CALFEX). In 2015, Orient Shield was added to Pacific Pathways, a United States Army Pacific (USARPAC) initiative to improve readiness and the scope and quality of regional engagements. In 2018, the 40th Infantry Division from California National Guard and 76th Infantry Brigade Combat Team (IBCT) from the Indiana National Guard became the first Total Force partners to participate in the exercise.

References

External links 

Military exercises involving the United States
Japanese military exercises
1985 establishments in Japan
Recurring events established in 1985